Governor Dundas may refer to:

Thomas Dundas (British Army officer) (1750–1794), Governor of Guadeloupe in 1794
George Dundas (colonial administrator) (1819–1880), Governor of Prince Edward Island from 1859 to 1868
Charles Dundas (governor) (1884–1956), Governor of the Bahamas from 1933 to 1940 and Governor of Uganda from 1940 to 1943
Lawrence Dundas, 2nd Marquess of Zetland (1876–1961), Governor of Bengal from 1917 to 1922
Francis Dundas (1759–1824), Acting Governor of the Cape Colony between 1798 and 1803
Philip Dundas (1762–1807), Governor of Prince of Wales Isle (Penang) from 1805 to 1807